Nordvestfjord, meaning 'Northwest Fjord', is a fjord in King Christian X Land, eastern Greenland.

Administratively most of its length lies in the Northeast Greenland National Park area, at the border of Sermersooq municipality. This fjord is part of the Scoresby Sound system.

History
The Nordvestfjord fjord was named by Carl Ryder during his 1891–92 expedition because of its approximate northwestern direction. Ryder, however, was prevented from exploring it because it was already September, new ice was forming, and a very strong wind was blowing from the interior of the fjord.

Geography
This long and very deep fjord is the northernmost arm of the Scoresby Sound. It is mostly surrounded by high mountains, whose sides rise steeply from its shore. Part of its northern flank marks the southern boundary of Nathorst Land and the Stauning Alps. To the northeast the fjord is bound by Scoresby Land, to the northwest by Charcot Land, and to the southwest by Hinksland, Th. Sørensen Land and Renland.

The Nordvestfjord winds its way roughly in a NW/SE direction. Its largest branch is the Flyver Fjord, which runs in a roughly west–east direction and joins the southwestern shore about midway through the fjord.

The fjord is fed by several glaciers. The Daugaard-Jensen Glacier is at the fjord's head flowing from the southwest and producing masses of icebergs. The mouth is located close to the mouth of Ofjord, between the Bjorne Islands to the southwest and South Cape (Sydkap) to the northeast, beyond which lies Northeast Bay (Nordøstbugt).

Glaciers, fjords and bays
From head to mouth:
 Daugaard-Jensen Glacier
 Fjord branch on the left bank
 F. Graae Glacier (Nord Glacier)
 "Charcot Glacier", a glacier flowing eastwards, to the southwest of F. Graae Glacier. The use of the name was discontinued because the name had been previously given to a glacier on Milne Land. Tthis glacier has currently no name.
 Hammerskjøld Glacier, Leicester Bay on the right bank
 Flyver Fjord, in the area of Leeds Bay and Lancaster Bay on the right bank
 Edvard Bay on the right bank
 Unnamed glacier on the right bank
 North Bay (Nordbugten) on the left bank
 Unnamed glacier on the left bank
 Snyder Bay on the left bank
Borgbjerg Glacier with Bacchus Glacier
 Triton Glacier and Neptunus Glacier (Løberengletscher) on the left bank
 Oxford Glacier on the left bank

See also
List of fjords of Greenland

References

External links

Discover the Scoresby Sund Fjord System in East Greenland
Holocene glacimarine sedimentation, inner Scoresby Sund
Fjords of Greenland
Scoresby Sound